Lambdin is a surname. Notable people with the surname include:

Dewey Lambdin (born 1945), American nautical historical novelist
George Cochran Lambdin (1830–1896), American Victorian artist, best known for his paintings of flowers
James Lambdin (1807–1889), American born artist, famous for many of his portraits of U.S. Presidents
Lambdin P. Milligan (1812–1899), lawyer, farmer, and a leader of the Knights of the Golden Circle during the American Civil War
Stephen Lambdin (born 1988), 13x Multi-National Taekwondo team member from the United States of America
Thomas Oden Lambdin, scholar of Semitic and Egyptian languages
William Wallace Lambdin (1861–1916), United States federal judge

See also
Lambda
Lambdina